Bhaironji Pant Pingale was the younger son of Moropant Trimbak Pingle. His father, Moropant Pingle was the first Peshwa of Chhattrapati Shivaji. 

When Kanhoji Angre attacked Satara in 1711, Bahiroji was taken a prisoner by him. Immediately Shahu I ordered Balaji Vishwanath to ensure his release and also gave Balaji Vishwanath authority in the form of the post of Peshwa, so that he could negotiate with Kanhoji Angre on behalf of the king.

His descendants, the Pingale family still lives in Kothrud Pune.

References

 Bombay University – Maratha History – Seminar Volume
 New History of Marathas by G S Sardesai (Phoenix Publications).
 Advanced Study in the History of Modern India 1701-1813 .Jaswant Lal Mehta (New Dawn Press - New Delhi )
 New Cambridge History of India: The Marathas, 1600-1818 By Stewart Gordon, Cambridge University Press.
 A History of the Maratha People by G.A.Kincaid and Rao Bahadur D.B.Parasnis (Humphrey Milford Oxford University Press).

People of the Maratha Empire
People from Maharashtra